WWCD (an acronym for What Would Chine Gun Do) is the debut studio album by American hip hop group Griselda. It was released on November 29, 2019, by Griselda, Shady, and Interscope.

Background
The album is entirely produced by Daringer and Beat Butcha, and features guest appearances from 50 Cent, Eminem, Raekwon, Keisha Plum, Novel, and Tiona Deniece. WWCD was titled in-part after late-rapper Machine Gun Black, the half-brother of group member Benny the Butcher, and cousin of Conway the Machine.

Its lead single, "Dr. Bird's", was released on October 18, 2019. The second single, "Chef Dreds", was released on November 8, 2019. Upon release, WWCD debuted at number eight on the Billboard Rap Albums and number nine on the Top R&B/Hip-Hop Albums charts. It also received positive critical reception. The album has yet to be released on physical media legitimately.

Track listing
All songs are produced by Daringer and Beat Butcha. Credits adapted from Apple Music.

 signifies a co-producer

Accolades

Charts

See also
2019 in hip hop music

References

2019 debut albums
Shady Records albums
Albums produced by Daringer (producer)
Albums produced by Eminem
Albums produced by Beat Butcha
Griselda Records albums